Religion in Togo is diverse, with Christianity being the most widely professed faith. A substantial number of the Togolese also practice traditional faiths and Islam.

A significant amount of Christians and Muslims in Togo also incorporate elements of folk religion.

Togo is a secular state and the nation's constitution provides freedom of religion and worship.

References